Obaidullah Khan Khattak is a lieutenant general in the Pakistan Army who was promoted to that rank on 20 December 2013 when he was assigned to Frontier Corps, Balochistan as inspector general of the Pakistan's paramilitary Frontier Corps force.

He replaced Lt Gen Syed Tariq Nadeem Gilani. He was appointed to the ASFC due to his extensive experiences in the restive province of Balochistan. He dealt with the hostile elements and militancy in the province via strategic implications which could detach the province from Pakistan.

There is no official confirmation of the dismissal of the army officers or any denial in this regard by the Inter-Services Public Relations (ISPR).

References

National Defence University, Pakistan alumni
Pakistan Military Academy alumni
Living people
Pakistan Army Artillery Corps officers
Pakistani generals
Pashtun people
Year of birth missing (living people)